Scott Fraser (born 25 March 1986 in Edinburgh) is an orienteering competitor from Great Britain. He received a silver medal in the sprint at the 2013 World Orienteering Championships in Vuokatti.

Fraser has also won the JK overall and sprint, as well as the British Orienteering Championships middle once and the Sprint a record three times in a row.

References

External links

1986 births
Living people
British orienteers
Male orienteers
Foot orienteers
World Orienteering Championships medalists
Alumni of the University of Edinburgh
Competitors at the 2009 World Games